Dark Blue is an American crime drama television series which premiered on TNT on July 15, 2009 and ended its run on September 15, 2010. The series is set in Los Angeles, California. It revolves around Carter Shaw (Dylan McDermott), the leader of an undercover unit. He is an officer who has dedicated his life to taking down the worst criminals in L.A., and this dedication has cost him his marriage. His team includes Ty Curtis, a newlywed who struggles between his job and his new life; Dean Bendis, an officer who is so deep in his undercover role that his team is no longer sure which side he is on; and Jaimie Allen, a green patrol cop recruited into the undercover unit because of her dark past and criminal skills. On November 16, 2010, TNT cancelled the series of Dark Blue after two seasons.

Premise 
Carter Shaw is the head of a crack undercover team of the Los Angeles Police Department that is so secret, many of the team members' own colleagues do not know they are involved.  Heir to several generations of police officers and a graduate of UCLA, Shaw quickly rose through the ranks of the LAPD.  He made a large number of arrests of high-profile criminals during his eighteen years on the force.  Shaw frequently uses criminal contacts to further leads and add substance to his team's covers during investigations; Carter's team members are often shocked at how friendly and casual he seems with known criminals.

Carter was married with one child before he became a deep undercover officer.  His ex-wife claims his double life was the reason their marriage dissolved.  This earlier part of his life is sharply contrasted with the one he now leads, in which he has few personal relationships.

His team includes a recently married cop (played by Omari Hardwick from TNT's Saved) who struggles with personal relationships he developed while undercover; a shoot-from-the-hip officer (played by Logan Marshall-Green) whose activities make fellow team members wonder if he has gone over to the other side; and a callow patrolwoman (played by Nicki Aycox) brought in because of her excellent skill in lying and her shady past.

Production 
Dark Blue comes to TNT from Warner Horizon Television, with prolific producer Jerry Bruckheimer who produced CSI and its spin-offs, as well as Cold Case and Without a Trace; Jonathan Littman, Danny Cannon, and Doug Jung serving as executive producers. KristieAnne Reed is co-executive producer. Cannon directed the pilot episode, which attracted 3.5 million viewers. The season finale was watched by 1.61 million viewers, a series low. The first season average was 2.589 million viewers. It was cancelled by TNT on November 16, 2010.

Cast 
 Dylan McDermott as Lt. Carter Shaw
 Omari Hardwick as Ty Curtis
 Logan Marshall-Green as Dean Bendis
 Nicki Aycox as Jaimie Allen (real name Jaimie Anderson according to her Detroit Juvenile Authority file)
 Tricia Helfer as FBI Special Agent Alex Rice (Season 2)

Series overview

Episodes

Season 1: 2009

Season 2: 2010

Home media
On July 6, 2011, Warner Bros. released Dark Blue: The Complete First Season on DVD in region 1 via their Warner Archive Collection.  This is a Manufacture-on-Demand (MOD) release, available exclusively through Warner's online store and only in the United States. The second and final season was released on May 8, 2012, once again an MOD release available via Warner Archive.

Music
Composer Graeme Revell, who frequently composes music on CSI: Miami and Eleventh Hour, along with David Russo III, who also composed Eleventh Hour.

Reception
Since the premiere, the series has gained mixed reviews. Verne Gay of Newsday praised the series, saying "This is a solid and particularly well-produced cop show—and should be, with Jerry Bruckheimer topping the credits—although we take off points for extreme violence..."; he gave the show 83 out of 100. The Philadelphia Inquirers Jonathan Storm gave it 70 out of 100, saying "If you're looking for unencumbered tough-guy entertainment, you won't be disappointed." Mary McNamara at the Los Angeles Times also gave the series a 70, saying "It's going to take more than an unshaven cheek and a few hollow coughs to make the character real, but Dark Blue'''s great supporting cast and high production values may buy its star enough time to disappear as effectively into his role as his undercover team disappears into theirs." The Boston Globe, however, criticized the show, saying "The characters are not especially dimensional, and McDermott's flat edginess as Carter doesn't help. But what's worse about Dark Blue'' is the sloppy plotting."

International broadcasting

References

External links 
 Official TNT website
 

2000s American crime drama television series
2000s American police procedural television series
2009 American television series debuts
2010s American crime drama television series
2010s American police procedural television series
2010 American television series endings
American action television series
English-language television shows
Television shows set in Los Angeles
TNT (American TV network) original programming
Television series by Warner Horizon Television
Fictional portrayals of the Los Angeles Police Department